Valerian of Forlì (Italian: Valeriano da Forlì) was, according to mediaeval Christian traditions, a patron saint of the city of Forlì. 

According to one tradition, Valerian was a soldier in Roman times who died a martyr in his city, probably in the locality of San Valeriano, known today as San Varano, together with eighty of his companions, the martyrs from Forlì. It was said that, despite being a soldier, Valerian refused to fight both in order not to endanger civilians and for refusing violence, and converted his fellow soldiers to Christianity. 

Another tradition, in connexion with the church of Santa Maria del Voto, attributes to a certain romito and preacher of the Roman era, also named Valerian, the performance of miraculous deeds and successful exorcisms.

Veneration 
On 4 May 1848, in Santa Croce, the cathedral of Forlì, his bones were moved from the chapel of the Madonna del Fuoco to the main altar. In addition to various works of art, he is depicted on the ancient municipal seal and on that of the bishop of Forlì.

He is remembered locally on 22 November, but does not appear in the official Roman Martyrology. In 1967 the Sacred Congregation of Rites expunged his feast day (4 May) from the liturgical calendar, due to confusion as to the identity of the historical Valerian.

See also 

 Mercurialis of Forlì

References

Further reading 

 Pasini, Adam (14 July 2009). "Santi Valeriano e LXXX compagni Martiri a Forlì". Santi, beati e testimoni – Enciclopedia dei Santi. Retrieved 24 February 2023.
 Zaghini Franco (1986). "S. Valeriano e gli ottanta compagni martiri forlivesi". Ravennatensia, XI. Atti del convegno di Comacchio (1981), Cesena, Abbey of Santa Maria del Monte. pp. 117–134.

Christian martyrs